The Canterbury Open is a darts tournament that has been held since 2009 in New Zealand. It's a silver graded event by the WDF

List of tournaments

Tournament records
 Most wins 2:  Haupai Puha
 Most Finals 3:  Bernie Smith,  Tony Carmichael.
 Most Semi Finals 3:  Bernie Smith,  Tony Carmichael,  Mike Day,  Jason Ladbrook. 
 Most Quarter Finals 5:  Bernie Smith. 
 Most Appearances 6:  Mike Day, Jason Ladbrook . 
 Most Prize Money won NZD$ 883:  Warren French 
 Best winning average (.) :  .
 Youngest Winner age 32:   Craig Caldwell.
 Oldest Winner age 32:  Craig Caldwell.

See also
List of BDO ranked tournaments
List of WDF tournaments

References

External links
New Zealand Darts Council

2009 establishments in New Zealand
Darts tournaments